Transitions is the third studio album by jazz guitarist Emily Remler. She was accompanied by John D'earth on the trumpet and by bassist Eddie Gomez and drummer Bob Moses in the rhythm section.

In the liner notes of this album Leonard Feather gathered Emily Remler's opinion about her choice of this group of musicians for this recording. She said: "Basically this is a guitar trio with a horn added" and "This left me responsible for all the harmony in the accompaniment", explaining that "I'm describing the chord changes, with nobody else behind me, which is quite a responsibility — specially on  my own tunes, which have hard changes. Also, I have to supply the harmonic aspects of the accompaniments to solos."

Reception

For the AllMusic reviewer Scott Yanow "this is one of the strongest of the six Emily Remler Concord recordings" he stated that it "was a strong step forward, as she started to really get away from her early Wes Montgomery/Herb Ellis influence and find a voice of her own".

Journalist Michael J. West wrote in JazzTimes that "Transitions" "marked an increasing focus on her own compositions and a step away from bebop conservatism."

Gear Diary's Michael Anderson commented: "Transitions was all about Remler respectfully stepping out of the shadows of her mentors and seeking her own path. Part of this was changing up her band... This simple move broke her out of the Herb/Wes band mold, and her compositional direction shifted to a more Latin feel as well. All six songs on the record are strong, with great performances by all – and Remler shows versatility and stylistic variety we hadn’t heard before."

The authors of The Penguin Guide to Jazz Recordings praised Remler's "instinct for fine, unexplored melody," and remarked: "All round, it's a remarkable performance and contributes
to one of the very best guitar jazz records of the decade."

The Washington Post's Mike Joyce stated: "there's no piano... As a result, the harmonic responsibilities for the group... rest with Remler, and she meets the challenge head-on... Throughout, each of the musicians develops a distinctive voice, yet together they achieve a smooth, cohesive blend."

Track listing

Personnel 
 Emily Remler – electric guitar
 John D'earth – trumpet
 Eddie Gomez – bass
 Bob Moses – drums

References

1983 albums
Emily Remler albums